Olivier Jacques Verdon (born 5 October 1995) is a professional footballer who plays as a central defender for Bulgarian club Ludogorets Razgrad. Born in France, he represents Benin at international level. He has become known for repeated instances of domestic violence, attempted murder, and aggression against partners.

Club career
Verdon signed his first professional contract on 27 April 2017 with Ligue 1 club FC Girondins de Bordeaux after successful seasons with their B team. He made his professional debut for Bordeaux in a Ligue 1 match against Olympique Marseille on 19 November 2017. He came on for Igor Lewczuk in the 80th minute of the 1–1 home draw.

On 11 June 2019, after a year with Ligue 2 side FC Sochaux-Montbéliard, Verdon signed a three-year contract with Deportivo Alavés in La Liga. On 2 September, however, he was loaned to KAS Eupen of the Belgian First Division A.

On 4 September 2020, Verdon was loaned to Bulgarian club PFC Ludogorets Razgrad for the season.

International career
Verdon was born in France and is of Beninese descent through his mother. He debuted for the Benin national football team on 24 March 2017, in a 1–0 friendly loss to Mauritania.

Career statistics

International

Honours

Club
Ludogorets Razgrad
Bulgarian First League: (2) 2020–21, 2021–22
Bulgarian Supercup: (2) 2021, 2022

References

External links
 
 
 
 

1995 births
Living people
Footballers from Hauts-de-Seine
French sportspeople of Beninese descent
Citizens of Benin through descent
Beninese footballers
French footballers
Association football defenders
Ligue 1 players
Ligue 2 players
Championnat National players
Championnat National 2 players
Championnat National 3 players
FC Girondins de Bordeaux players
FC Sochaux-Montbéliard players
Angoulême Charente FC players
Deportivo Alavés players
Belgian Pro League players
K.A.S. Eupen players
First Professional Football League (Bulgaria) players
PFC Ludogorets Razgrad players
Benin international footballers
2019 Africa Cup of Nations players
Beninese expatriate footballers
French expatriate footballers
Beninese expatriate sportspeople in Spain
French expatriate sportspeople in Spain
French expatriate sportspeople in Belgium
French expatriate sportspeople in Bulgaria
Expatriate footballers in Spain
Expatriate footballers in Belgium
Expatriate footballers in Bulgaria
People from Clamart
Black French sportspeople